Hidden Track is the second EP by Taiwanese singer Jay Chou, released on 11 November 2003 by Sony Music Taiwan.

Track listing
CD
 "Orbit" (軌跡) – 5:22 
 "Broken String" (斷了的弦) – 4:53
 "Orbit" (Instrumental) – 5:22
 "Broken String" (Instrumental) – 4:53
DVD
 "In the Name of Father" (以父之名)
 "Coward" (懦夫)
 "Sunny Day" (晴天)
 "Class 3-2" (三年二班)
 "East Wind Breaks" (東風破)
 "You Hear Me" (妳聽得到)
 "Same Tone" (同一種調調)
 "Her Eyelashes" (她的睫毛)
 "Cliff" (愛情懸崖)
 "Terrace Field" (梯田)
 "Double Blade" (雙刀)

References

External links
  Jay Chou discography@JVR Music

2003 EPs
Mandopop EPs
Jay Chou albums
Sony Music Taiwan albums